This is a list of animated feature films first released in 2012.

Highest-grossing films

The top ten animated films by worldwide gross in 2012 are as follows:

See also
List of animated television series of 2012

References

2012
2012-related lists